Her Temporary Husband is a 1923 American silent comedy film directed by John McDermott and starring Owen Moore. Based upon a play of the same name by Edward A. Paulton, it was produced and distributed by Associated First National (later First National Pictures).

Plot
As described in a film magazine review, Blanche Ingram must marry within twenty four hours or she will lose a fortune. She arranges to marry John Ingram, an old man she believes will not live long. Wealthy Thomas Burton, who is in love with Blanche, disguises himself as the elderly invalid and goes through the marriage ceremony. The real old man's secretary, with the aid of underworld thugs, plans to kill Burton. Burton's valet Judd disguises himself as his master and sends out a radio call for help to the army, navy, police, Elks, and other organizations. They all respond and the gang is captured. Burton is accepted as a permanent rather than temporary husband by Blanche.

Cast

Preserrvation
With no prints of Her Temporary Husband located in any film archives, it is a lost film.

References

External links

Several stills at www.charliechaplinarchive.org (scroll to the right for the next still)

1923 films
American silent feature films
1923 comedy films
Silent American comedy films
Lost American films
First National Pictures films
American black-and-white films
Films directed by John McDermott
1923 lost films
Lost comedy films
1920s American films